Taylor's worm snake (Malayotyphlops canlaonensis) is a species of snake in the Typhlopidae family.

References

Malayotyphlops
Reptiles described in 1917